Camp McGarry was a U.S. military camp located in what is now the Summit Lake Indian Reservation in Humboldt County, Nevada.

History
Camp McGarry was established as a field camp on November 23, 1865.  It was named for Brevet Brigadier General Edward McGarry.  With a size of  it was, at the time, the largest military reserve in Nevada.  In 1866 the headquarters of the district of Nevada were moved from Fort Churchill to Camp McGarry.  In the summer of 1868, the bulk of the troops were moved from Camp McGarry, with the camp being abandoned on December 18, 1868. On March 25, 1871, the camp was relinquished by the Army and turned over to the U.S. Department of the Interior for use as the Summit Lake Indian Reservation.

References

1865 establishments in Nevada
American Civil War army posts
Formerly Used Defense Sites in Nevada
Nevada historical markers
Nevada in the American Civil War